The Sinamalé Bridge links the islands of Malé, Hulhulé and Hulhumalé (through Hulhulé') in the Maldives. The 1.39 km long bridge has two car lanes and separate lanes for motorcycles, and pedestrians, and opened on 30 August 2018. It was originally called the China-Maldives Friendship Bridge due to funding received from the Chinese government. It is the first inter-island bridge in the Maldives.

The idea of a bridge between the two islands of Malé and Hulhulé was first raised in 2007 and was widely discussed in 2008 following the pledge on constructing a bridge by the then president Maumoon during his presidential campaign. Mohamed Nasheed, another presidential candidate, and the opposition criticized the idea at the time 

It was started by president Abdulla Yameen in 2014 and was officially inaugurated in 2018.

It is estimated the bridge would cost , of which  will be paid by the Chinese government as a grant in aid. China Harbour Engineering (CHEC) is the main contractor and had been praised for the Sultan Abdul Halim Muadzam Shah Bridge in Malaysia.

On 8 January 2022 the Government of Maldives and the China International Development Cooperation signed a letter of exchange to conduct a feasibility study on the management and maintenance of the Sinamalé Bridge.

See also 
 China–Maldives relations

References

Bridges in the Maldives
Bridges completed in 2018
2018 establishments in the Maldives
China–Maldives relations